Taneli Tikka (born 8 March 1978, Savitaipale, Finland) is a Finnish serial entrepreneur and IT influencer.

Career

Tikka studied software engineering at a school which is now known as the Metropolia University of Applied Sciences. While studying, he started to work for Nokia as a design engineer. In 1999 he stopped his studies as he started his first company with his friends. Taika Technologies Ltd. specialised in digital- and multimedia-based social networking solutions. The company went bankrupt in 2002 and Tikka continued his studies at the Helsinki School of Economics, where he graduated First in Academic Standing of this class from the Executive MBA programme in 2004.

After Taika Technology's bankruptcy Tikka worked at WM-data (now CGI) and at Ruukki Group (now Afarak Group) from 2003 to 2006. Then he was offered a task at unprofitable Magenta company. Magenta Sites was the hosting and IT services company behind the global distribution of the Star Wreck movie, and also the long time hosting partner for Habbo Hotel). Tikka worked in Magenta over the period from 2003 to 2007.

In 2005, Tikka started at Dynamoid where he was responsible for IRC-Galleria's marketing and strategy, the following year he was appointed as Dynamoid's CEO. In 2007 IRC-Galleria was sold for 12.5 million euros to Sulake Corporation, the company behind Habbo Hotel. After that Tikka was hired as COO at Dopplr (2007 - 2009) with e.g. Lisa Sounio and Marko Ahtisaari who were among Dopplr founders. The service's idea was to save the business travellers' network so that they know who of their friends are living in the area they are visiting or who of their contacts are travelling to the same destination at the same time as they are. It also showed the local restaurants or shops recommended by other users. Nokia acquired Dopplr in September 2009. From 2008 to 2009 Tikka was CEO at RunToShop, a social shopping startup.

From 2010 to 2011 Tikka was Health Puzzle's CEO. In 2009, Tikka started as a member of the Soprano Plc (NASDAQ OMX listed public company) Board of Directors and in 2011 he was appointed as company's Executive Vice President and was in charge of their web solutions division. In early 2012 Tikka was promoted to Chief Operating Officer of Soprano Plc. Tikka was working in Soprano until 2012.

Tikka was one of the co-founders of the Startup Sauna Foundation. Its purpose is to help young promising companies. Startup Sauna had a 1,500 square meter co-working space on Aalto University's campus in Otaniemi and it was the main-organizer of Slush, the largest startup conference in Northern Europe. Tikka was acting as Startup Sauna and Summer of Startups programs' coach.

In 2012, Tikka assumed the position of CEO of Wunderkraut Finland, a company specialised in web and application development. At the same time, he was appointed to the executive management team and Board of the Wunderkraut Group and became one of the private shareholders in the company. Tikka worked at Wunderkraut until 2013.

Tikka is one of the TLD Registry founders and was its chairman of the board from 2011 to 2014. In September 2013 Tikka announced that ICANN granted the company a global monopoly for two Chinese top-level domains. The company sold exclusively two domains meaning ".online" and ".Chinese website", written in Chinese characters. The domain names are used in the same way as, for example, extensions .com and .net. The rights for selling were given by ICANN organization, which has the right to manage the Internet addresses worldwide.

Tikka was appointed Head of Industrial Internet at Tieto Corporation in May 2014, a position in which he was able to influence the establishment of the new unit. It operated within the company very much like a startup. The unit was organised according to the Lean Innovation model. The unit had its own administrative system and enjoyed a high degree of autonomy. Tieto's CEO hopes that the culture of the Industrial Internet unit will exercise a positive influence on Tieto's corporate culture in general.

Tikka started as a CEO of a Finnish stated-owned enterprise called  in June 2018. Vake's purpose is to create Finnish Clusters of Innovation using new technology like Artificial intelligence. His position as Vake's CEO ended in July 2019.

Appointments
Taneli Tikka has been involved in more than 30 companies as a board member or as an advisor. These include Applifier (now part of Unity Technologies), Balancion, BrandMNGR, Kemppi, MTV, Netcycler, PackageMedia, Relevant Point, Solu, Stardoll, Sulava, Transfluent, Umbra Software and Web of Trust.

Tikka has also been involved in various state's programs. In 2008, Tikka was appointed to the management team of Tekes' (Finnish governmental Funding Agency for Technology and Innovation) Verso technology program. The program lasted until 2010 and was a pioneer program of its time showing the way for Small and medium-sized enterprises of what is required to grow the business and to expand abroad. Many of the Verso program companies grew fast, including gaming companies Supercell and Rovio. Tikka was a member of the steering group of Vigo program which supported promising companies. He took also part in Government Report of the Future which handled the future of the business life.

Recognitions
Tikka was on the Muxlim Board of Directors from 2007 to 2009. It was the world's largest social network for Muslims. The company received the Internationalization Award of the President of the Republic of Finland in 2009.

A Finnish lifestyle magazine called AKU. (short for Aku Ankka, Donald Duck) nominated him as the Scrooge McDuck of Finland and described him getting all the best toys from others when he was playing in the sandbox. Tikka commented the selection by saying that he and Uncle Scrooge both enjoy learning new things despite their age.

In March 2011 the Finnish Information Processing Association appointed Tikka as the ICT Opinion Leader of the Year 2010.

Tikka was included in Finnish Technology magazine "Tivi"'s Top 100 IT influences ranking list in 2013. In 2014 Future Board (association for young board professionals in Finland) awarded Tikka as Young Board Member of the Year.

Private life

Tikka was the first child of his Finnish mother and Georgian father.

References

External links 
Tieto’s Taneli Tikka explains Industrial Internet

1978 births
Living people
People from Savitaipale
Finnish bloggers
Businesspeople from Helsinki
Finnish people of Georgian descent